Intentional Software was a software company that designed tools and platforms that followed the principles of intentional programming in which programmers focus on capturing the intent of users and designers, and spend as little time as possible interacting with machines and compilers. Its tools included language workbenches, tools that separated software function from implementation, and allowed 'language-focused' development.  This allowed automatic rewriting of code as expert knowledge of implementation options changed.  The company later began developing a platform for improving productivity of software groups.

The company was co-founded by Charles Simonyi and Gregor Kiczales in 2002, and later headed by CEO Eric Anderson. However, Kiczales left the company in 2003. In 2017 it had almost 100 staff. On April 18, 2017, it was acquired by Microsoft, with many of its employees joining the Microsoft Office team.

Products and services 
Intentional Software developed the Domain Workbench, a language workbench for building and working with domain-specific languages, and designed custom languages for clients for their particular uses. They also built the Intentional Platform, a platform for group productivity software.

References

External links
 Intentional Software website
 Martin Fowler's essay on the company

Software companies based in Washington (state)
Microsoft acquisitions
2017 mergers and acquisitions
Privately held companies based in Washington (state)
Software companies established in 2002
Companies based in Bellevue, Washington
Defunct software companies of the United States

2002 establishments in the United States
2002 establishments in Washington (state)
Companies established in 2002